The Pittsburgh Burghers were a professional baseball team based in Pittsburgh, Pennsylvania, that played in the Players' League for one season in 1890. The franchise used Exposition Park as their home field. During their only season in existence, the team finished sixth in the PL with a record of 60–68.

Players

References

External links
Franchise index at Baseball-Reference and Retrosheet

Major League Baseball all-time rosters